Benjamin Agus was an Anglican divine of the English Church. He was one of the most distinguished early vindicators of the nonconformists with Richard Baxter and Vincent Alsop.

He is a native of Wymondham, Norfolk. He entered Corpus College, Cambridge, in 1639 and then proceeded M.A in 1657. In his will, it is said that in 21 May 1683 he was ejected from Chenies, Buckinghamshire.

Career 
Benjamin's works included Vindication of Nonconformity and the Antidote to Dr. Stillingfleet's Unreasonableness of Separation; being a defense of the former.

References

English religious writers
Nonconformism
English Christian religious leaders
Year of death unknown
17th-century English writers
17th-century English male writers
Year of birth unknown